Stanisławów District League was a regional association football championship in the Stanisławów Voivodeship, Poland (then Second Polish Republic) in 1934-1939.

The league was created out of the Lwów District League on 15 April 1934 after receiving approval from the Polish Football Union on 21 March 1934. The Stanisławów District League is also considered to be a precursor of the Ivano-Frankivsk Oblast Football Federation championship in the modern Ukraine. Practically all of the clubs of the league represented various detachment of the Polish Armed Forces due to the Polish colonization policies in the Eastern Galicia (see Polonization#Polonization in Eastern Borderlands (Kresy)).

Champions

Cup finals

All time table
In italic are names of the clubs that did not participate in the last season.

Notes:
Pogon Stryj played here only for a single season and returned to the Lwów District League.
Game Rypne - Pokucie Kolomyja 1:18 was canceled, due to suspected fraud.
KS stands for Sport Club (Klub Sportowy)
ST stands for Sport Association (Sportowe Towarzystwo)
WCKS stands for Military-Civilian Sport Club (Wojskowe-Civilny Klub Sportowy)
SKS stands for Sport Club Stanislawow (or Stryi) 
pp stands for Infantry Regiment (49th Hutsul Rifle Regiment)
TESP Kalusz was sponsored by TESP (Lwów)

See also
 Ivano-Frankivsk Oblast Football Federation

Notes

References

External links
 From Opillia to Carpathian. Football Federation of Ukraine. 14 March 2011
 List of Champions that includes winners of both the Stanislawow District and the Ivano-Frankivsk Oblast championships

2
History of football in Poland
Stanisławów Voivodeship
1934 in Polish football
1935 in Polish football
1936 in Polish football
1937 in Polish football
1938 in Polish football
1939 in Polish football